Mary Galloway is a Canadian film director, writer and actor from the Cowichan Nation. She is best known for her web series Querencia.

Career
Galloway is a graduate of the Director's Lab at the Canadian Film Centre. Her debut short film, Unintentional Mother, premiered at the Whistler Film Festival. She was recognized as a 2017 TIFF Rising Star. In 2021, her web series, Querencia, premiered on APTN Lumi in Canada and on Revry TV globally.

Filmography

As actress

 2022 – Overlord and the Underwoods
 2021 – Playground Rules
 2021 – Querencia
 2020 – On the 12th Date of Christmas
 2019 – Ruthless Souls
 2018 – Wynter
 2018 – Colour of Scar Tissue
 2017 – Unintentional Mother

 2017 – Never Steady, Never Still
 2016 – The Switch
 2016 – A Safe Place
 2015 – Fire Song
 2014 – Untold Stories of the E.R.
 2013 – Supernatural
 2012 – Ancient Lights
 2011 – Foreclosed

Awards and nominations

References

External links
 

Canadian women film directors
Canadian women screenwriters
Canadian women film producers
Canadian film actresses
21st-century Canadian screenwriters
21st-century Canadian women writers
21st-century Canadian actresses
Living people
Year of birth missing (living people)